The tenth series of British reality television series The Apprentice (UK) was broadcast in the UK on BBC One, from 14 October to 21 December 2014; due to live coverage in Summer of that year for both the FIFA World Cup and the Commonwealth Games in Glasgow, the BBC postponed the series' broadcast until Autumn to avoid clashing with these. It is the last series to feature Nick Hewer as Alan Sugar's aide, who left the programme following the series finale, with the tenth series featuring a guest appearance from Ricky Martin, winner of the eighth series, as an interviewer for the Interviews Stage for this series only.

Production on the tenth series included two prominent tasks traditionally used in the show's format being specially designed towards celebrating The Apprentices tenth year of broadcast. In addition, other tasks featured a more varied arrangement of challenges that included some being geared towards the technology industry. Alongside the standard twelve episodes, with the first two aired within a day of each other, the series featured two specials before its premiere – "Meet the Candidates", made available online only on 7 October; and "Ten Years of The Apprentice" on 13 October – and two specials aired alongside this series – "The Final Five" on 16 December ; and "Why I Fired Them" on 18 December 

Marking the programme's tenth series, production staff selected twenty candidates to take part, the highest number to be involved in any variation of The Apprentice globally, with Mark Wright becoming the overall winner. Excluding specials, the series averaged around 7.40 million viewers during its broadcast.

Series overview 
Applications for the tenth series began in Spring 2013, towards the end of the ninth series' broadcast, with the selection process of auditions, assessments and interviews held within mid-Summer of that year. As The Apprentice was now entering its tenth year, production staff and Alan Sugar discussed how to celebrate this milestone before filming would begin, opting on a few key decisions. One such decision was on the design of the tasks; apart from creating more variety in these than in the previous series – some focused on technology and another aimed at dividing teams to work both within the UK and abroad – two traditional tasks – the first sales task, and the bargain-hunting task – were designed around celebrating the programme's milestone, featuring the involvement of items that had been sold within these tasks. However, the more key decision agreed upon was on the number of candidates that would take part in the series. While the production staff selected sixteen candidates, as had been done in the past since the third series, they were kept unaware that a further four applicants had also been selected to take part, until filming for the series began. The decision to increase the number of candidates meant that Sugar was required to perform more multiple firings than before, allowing for the series to include a triple firing outside of the Interviews stage, the first time in the programme's history that this occurred, though reaction from fans was mixed over this decision during the series' broadcast.

During filming, Nick Hewer began to contemplate his future on the programme, after finding the strain on his stamina becoming increasingly difficult to cope with from the amount of work he had do on and off-camera. Alongside other commitments, including his new role as host of Channel 4s Countdown, he eventually decided that the tenth series would be his last on The Apprentice, revealing his decision towards the end of the tenth series' broadcast, with it fully confirmed by Sugar on social media and the You're Fired half of the series finale. Apart from Hewer, Margaret Mountford decided that, after working as an interviewer for the past four series, she would not be returning, leading to Sugar inviting Ricky Martin to interviewing candidates who made it to the Interviews stage.

Prior to filming being completed and editing finalised, the BBC found that it could not place the tenth series in its Spring 2014 schedule because of live coverage of two major sporting events in that year – FIFA World Cup and the Commonwealth Games in Glasgow. As a result, it was forced to have episodes aired in Autumn to where it could have less competition for viewing figures, with Sugar confirming this decision during October 2013. To accommodate the final edit of the tenth series, the premiere was preceded by a special, entitled "Ten Years of The Apprentice", which was focused on highlights from the past nine series of The Apprentice, mainly towards scenes that were memorable for Sugar, Hewer, and Karren Brady. In addition, this series saw the introduction of an online exclusive mini-episode, entitled "Meet the Candidates – using tapes from the selection process, the production staff invited comedian Matt Edmondson, a fan of The Apprentice who had been involved in online spin-offs for the programme, to star in a spoof online episode, in which he "interviewed" the candidates who had secured a place on the tenth series, usually deriving comedy from his responses to genuine answers and replies that each candidate had made to questions.

When filming began, the first task saw the men name their team as Summit, while the women went under the team name of Tenacity after this task – their initial name of Decadence was not changed at any point during filming of this task when it was chosen, and was not edited out by production staff; reviewers for the first episode remarked that this choice was a "terrible" one to select for a team name, despite the reasons for its selection. Of those who took part, Mark Wright would become the eventual winner, going on to use his prize to start up an SEO business called Climb Online.

Candidates

Performance chart 

Key:
 The candidate won this series of The Apprentice.
 The candidate was the runner-up.
 The candidate won as project manager on his/her team, for this task.
 The candidate lost as project manager on his/her team, for this task.
 The candidate was on the winning team for this task / they passed the Interviews stage.
 The candidate was on the losing team for this task.
 The candidate was brought to the final boardroom for this task.
 The candidate was fired in this task.
 The candidate lost as project manager for this task and was fired.

Episodes

Ratings 
Official episode viewing figures are from BARB.

Note: During the 2-hour final, the show was shared with The Apprentice: You're Hired, and as a result the figures are lower than expected. The first hour was the main show whereas the second hour was You're Hired. Original overnights for the final put the first hour at one million viewers more than the 2-hour average.

Specials

References

External links 

 

10
10